Sandy is a popular unisex given name. The male version can be a diminutive of Alexander, Sander, Alasdair, Sandipan, Sandeep, Sanford, Santiago, etc.,  while the female version can be a diminutive for Sandra (itself a diminutive of Alexandra and Cassandra) or, less commonly, Alisande. Female spelling variations include Sandi and Sandie.

Notable people named Sandy include:

Men
 Sandy Alderson (born 1947), American baseball executive
 Sandy Allan (born 1947), Scottish footballer
 Sandy Alomar Jr. (born 1966), American baseball player 
 Sandy Alomar Sr. (born 1943), American baseball player
 Sandy Amorós (1930–1992), Major League Baseball player from Cuba
 Sandy Becker (1922–1996), American actor and television host
 Sandy Brown (1929–1975), Scottish jazz clarinetist
 Alexander Calder (1898–1976), American sculptor and artist
 Sandy Cohen (born 1995), American-Israeli basketball player in the Israeli Basketball Premier League
 Sandy Collins (born 1978), Canadian politician 
 Sandy Dvore, American artist
 Sandy Frank (born 1929), American television producer
 Sandy Gall (born 1937), Scottish journalist and broadcaster
 Sandy Gunn (1919–1944), British Second World War pilot and prisoner of war executed for participating in the "Great Escape"
 Alex Hair (1898–1970), Scottish footballer 
 Sandy Hollway, Australian public servant
 Sandy Jardine (1948–2014), Scottish footballer
 Sandy Koufax (born 1935), American Major League Baseball Hall of Fame pitcher
 Brian Lane (RAF officer) (1917–1942), British Second World War flying ace
 Sandy Lyle (born 1958), Scottish golfer
 Alexander MacAra (1932–2012), British epidemiologist
 Sandy Munro (born 1938), Canadian-American engineer
 Sandy Nelson (1938–2022), American rock and roll drummer
 Sandy Nelson (footballer) Australian footballer
 Sandy Newbigging (1876–1976), Scottish footballer 
 Alexander Patch (1889–1945), US Army general in World War II
 Sandy Powell (comedian) (1900–1982), British comedian
 Sandy Rass, British songwriter and musical theatre star
 Sandy Rothman (born 1946), American bluegrass musician and producer
 Sandy Sandberg (1910–1989), American football player
 Sandy Satullo, II (born 1954), American former NASCAR Cup Series driver
 Sandy Smith (born 1983), Scottish visual artist
 Sandy Stuvik (born 1995), Thai racing driver
 Sandy Tatum (1920–2017), American attorney and golf administrator
 Sandy Wollaston (1875–1930), British explorer
 Sandy Woodward (born 1932), nickname of British Admiral John Woodward

Women
 Sandy Abi Elias, Lebanese-British footballer
 Sandy Chambers, British singer
 Sandy Dennis (1937–1992), American actress
 Sandy Denny (1947–1978), British singer and songwriter
 Sandy Descher, American actress
 Sandy Dillon, American singer and songwriter
 Sandy Duncan, American singer and actress
 Sandy Fox, American singer and actress
 Sandy Green (singer), British singer and songwriter
 Sandy Heribert, French-British TV journalist
 Sandy Johnson (born 1954), American model and actress 
 Sandy Lam, Hong Kong singer
 Sandy McGarry, American politician from South Carolina (born 1961)
 Sandy Mölling, German singer
 Sandhya Mridul (born 1975), Indian actress nicknamed Sandy
 Sandy Powell (costume designer) (born 1960)
 Sandy Ratcliff (1948-2019), English actress
 Sandie Shaw (born 1947), English singer
 Sandy Shaw (writer) (born 1943), American writer on health
 Sandy Shaw (politician) (born 1960), Canadian politician
 Sandy Schreier, American fashion historian and collector
 Sandi Thom (born 1981), Scottish singer-songwriter
 Sandi Toksvig, British-Danish comedian, writer, actor, presenter and producer
 Sandy Verschoor, an Australian Dutch politician and current mayor
 Sandy West, American musician, drummer in The Runaways
 Sandy Wollschlager, American chemist and politician

Fictional characters
 Sandy, a character in 2012 American horror film Sloppy the Psychotic
 Sandy, half of Julian and Sandy in the British radio comedy Round the Horne
 Sandy, Little Orphan Annie's dog
 Sandy, in Mark Twain's novel A Connecticut Yankee in King Arthur's Court
 Sandy, in the 1967 novel The Outsiders
 Sandy, a sandman in Kidsongs: Good Night, Sleep Tight by Arthur Beddard
 Sandy, in the Japanese television series Monkey based on Journey to the West
 Sandy, a rail speeder in the American-Canadian television series Thomas & Friends: All Engines Go!
 Sandy Bachman, in season 4 of the American television drama series Homeland
 Sandy Brown (Noozles), from the Japanese anime The Noozles
 Sandy Cheeks, in the animated TV series SpongeBob SquarePants
 Sandy Cohen, in the TV series The OC, played by Peter Gallagher
 Sandy Hawkins, a DC Comics superhero
 Sandy Milkovich, a recurring character in the American TV series Shameless
 Sandy Olsson, in the 1978 musical film Grease
 Sandy Ricks, in the 1963 film Flipper
 Alejandro "Sandy" Stern, in the novel Presumed Innocent by Scott Turow and subsequent movie
 Sandy Sunshine, in the video games Mugen Souls and Mugen Souls Z
 Sandy Thomas, in the British soap opera Emmerdale
 Alexander Wilson, in the TV series Shetland
 Sha Wujing (Sandy), in the Chinese epic Journey to the West
 Sandy Bigelow Patterson, in the 2013 American road comedy film Identity Thief

See also
 Sandy (disambiguation)

English feminine given names
English-language unisex given names
English unisex given names
Feminine given names
Unisex given names
Masculine given names
Lists of people by nickname
Hypocorisms